Dodurga District is a district of the Çorum Province of Turkey. Its seat is the town of Dodurga. Its area is 229 km2, and its population is 5,265 (2022).

Composition
There is one municipality in Dodurga District:
 Dodurga

There are 12 villages in Dodurga District:

 Akkaya
 Alpagut
 Ayvaköy
 Berkköy
 Çiftlikköy
 Dikenli
 Kirenci
 Kuyucak
 Mehmetdedeobruğu
 Mehmetdedetekkesi
 Tutuş
 Yeniköy

References

Districts of Çorum Province